Ita was an Ancient Egyptian king's daughter who lived in the 12th Dynasty around 1850 BC. She is known from the statue of a sphinx found in Qatna in modern Syria. The statue is today in the Louvre (AO 14075). On this statue she bears the titles noblewoman (iryt-p`t) and king's daughter of his body. She is perhaps further known from her burial next to the pyramid of king Amenemhat II at Dahshur. The burial was found intact and contained a decorated wooden coffin with longer religious texts including her name and a set of precious personal adornments, including a richly adorned dagger. It is uncertain whether both women are identical. The location of the tomb might indicate that she was a daughter of Amenemhat II.

References 

Princesses of the Twelfth Dynasty of Egypt
19th-century BC women